Amro Basil Issa Al-Wir (born 23 January 2001) is a Jordanian swimmer. He competed in the 2020 Summer Olympics.

References

External links
 
 Florida Gators bio

2001 births
Living people
Swimmers at the 2020 Summer Olympics
Jordanian male swimmers
Olympic swimmers of Jordan
Swimmers at the 2018 Summer Youth Olympics
Asian Games competitors for Jordan
Swimmers at the 2018 Asian Games
Florida Gators men's swimmers
Sportspeople from Amman
21st-century Jordanian people